Lee Gyeong-hui (born 9 March 1958) is a South Korean speed skater. She competed in two events at the 1972 Winter Olympics.

References

1958 births
Living people
South Korean female speed skaters
Olympic speed skaters of South Korea
Speed skaters at the 1972 Winter Olympics
Place of birth missing (living people)
20th-century South Korean women